The John Gorrie State Museum is a Florida State Park located in Apalachicola, a block off U.S. 98. It commemorates the man who was a pioneer in developing air conditioning, receiving the first U.S. Patent for mechanical refrigeration in 1851. The address is 46 Sixth Street.

Recreational activities
The museum features exhibits about Apalachicola and the life and inventions of John Gorrie.

Admission and hours
The visitor center is open from 9:00 a.m. until 5:00 p.m. Thursday through Monday. The center is closed on Thanksgiving, Christmas and New Years Day. There is a $2.00 per person entrance fee.

External links
 John Gorrie Museum State Park at Florida State Parks
 John Gorrie Museum State Park at State Parks
 John Gorrie State Museum at Absolutely Florida

State parks of Florida
Museums in Apalachicola, Florida
Gorrie, John
Industry museums in Florida
Parks in Franklin County, Florida
1958 establishments in Florida
Museums established in 1958